The 1974–75 1. Slovenská národná hokejová liga season was the 6th season of the 1. Slovenská národná hokejová liga, the second level of ice hockey in Czechoslovakia alongside the 1. Česká národní hokejová liga. 12 teams participated in the league, and TJ Lokomotíva Bučina Zvolen won the championship. TJ ŽS Spišská Nová Ves relegated.

Regular season

Standings

Qualification to 1975–76 Czechoslovak Extraliga

 TJ Lokomotíva Bučina Zvolen – TJ Ingstav Brno 1–4 (2–4, 1–6, 2–1, 1–6, 0–5)
 TJ Ingstav Brno won the series 4–1 and qualified to 1975–76 Czechoslovak Extraliga.

References

External links
 Season on avlh.sweb.cz (PDF)
 Season on hokejpoprad.sk

Czech
1st. Slovak National Hockey League seasons
2